"Discolights" is a song written and produced by Ultrabeat and Darren Styles, taken from Styles' debut solo album, Skydivin' and Ultrabeat's second album The Weekend Has Landed. The song combines the hardcore and commercial styles of the two artists. It was released on 23 June 2008 as a digital download; a physical single was released on 28 July 2008.

Track listing
CD promo / CD single / download
Radio Edit – (2:46)
Extended Mix – (5:13)
Darren Styles Hardcore Mix – (3:31)
Hypasonic Remix – (6:01)
Scooter Remix – (6:06)
Bassfreakerz Remix – (5:50)
Riffs & Rays Remix – (7:49)
12" promo
Original Mix
Darren Styles Hardcore Remix

Hypasonic Remix
Bassfreakerz Remix

Personnel
Ultrabeat
 Mike Di Scala – vocals, producer
 Chris Henry – producer

Darren Styles
 Darren Styles – producer

Music video
The music video, directed by Paul Boyd and produced by Adrian Fulle, was filmed in Los Angeles on 28 April 2008. It shows two robots coming to life and people dancing in a nightclub where the video was shot. Starring Ultrabeat and Darren Styles, the video also shows Mike Di Scala singing the lyrics to the song on the dancefloor with Chris Henry and Darren Styles DJing. The main focus of the video, however, is the two robots dancing under the discolights.

Chart performance
On June 29, 2008, the song entered the UK Singles Chart at No. 110 on downloads alone, eventually peaking at No. 23.

References

External links
 
 
 

2008 songs
2008 singles
Ultrabeat songs
Songs written by Darren Styles
Songs written by Mike Di Scala
All Around the World Productions singles
Music videos directed by Paul Boyd